Robert Flack (5 April 1917 – 3 November 1993) was a South African cricketer who played for Eastern Province. He was born in Port Elizabeth. Flack made a single first-class appearance for the side, during the 1945–46 season, against Griqualand West. From the middle of the order, he scored 9 runs in the only innings in which he batted.

References

External links
Robert Flack at CricketArchive 
Robert Flack at ESPNcricinfo

1917 births
1993 deaths
South African cricketers
Eastern Province cricketers